Sheilla Castro de Paula Blassioli (born 1 July 1983 in Belo Horizonte) is a former volleyball player from Brazil, who represented her native country at the 2008 Summer Olympics and in the 2012 Summer Olympics.  On both occasions the Brazilian national team won the gold medal. She also played the 2016 Summer Olympics, when Brazil placed fifth. She retired on April 9, 2022.

Career
She plays as opposite in the Brazilian national team, and in Molico/Osasco. She made her debut for the national team against Colombia.

Castro was named "Most Valuable Player" at the 2006 FIVB World Grand Prix in Reggio Calabria, Italy, and at the 2009 FIVB World Grand Prix in Tokyo, Japan, with Brazil winning the gold medal both times.
At the 2011 Pan-American Cup, Castro was given the "Most Valuable Player" award, also winning the gold medal with her national team.

Sheilla was part of the national team who won the gold medal at the 2011 Pan American Games held in Guadalajara, Mexico.

Playing with Sollys Nestlé Osasco, Castro won the gold medal and the "Most Valuable Player" and "Best Scorer" awards in the 2012 FIVB Club World Championship held in Doha, Qatar.

Castro won the "Best Opposite" award and the gold medal with her National Team in the 2013 South American Championship held in Ica, Peru.
Castro won the silver medal in the 2014 FIVB Club World Championship after her club lost 0–3 to the Russian Dinamo Kazan in the championship match.

Castro played with her national team, winning the bronze at the 2014 World Championship when her team defeated Italy 3–2 in the bronze medal match.
She won the Best Opposite Spiker in the 2016 FIVB World Grand Prix.

After finishing the 2016 Olympic Games in 5th place, Castro announced her retirement from the national team. In 2019, without playing for three years even for clubs, she decided to return to the national team and played the 2019 FIVB World Cup and the 2019 South American Championship.

Clubs
 Mackenzie Esporte Clube (1997–)
 MRV/Minas (2001–2004)
 Scavolini Pesaro (2004–2008)
 São Caetano/Blausiegel (2008–2010)
 Unilever/Rio de Janeiro (2010–2012)
 Molico Osasco (2012–2014)
 Vakıfbank Istanbul (2014–2016)
 Minas Tênis Clube (2019–2020)
 Athletes Unlimited Volleyball (2020–2022)

Awards

Individuals
 2005 FIVB World Grand Champions Cup – "Most Valuable Player"
 2005 FIVB World Grand Champions Cup – "Best Scorer"
 2005–06 CEV Cup – "Best Spiker"
 2006 FIVB World Grand Prix – "Most Valuable Player"
 2008–09 Brazilian Superleague – "Best Scorer"
 2008–09 Brazilian Superleague – "Best Spiker"
 2009 FIVB World Grand Prix – "Most Valuable Player"
 2009–10 Brazilian Superliga – "Best Spiker"
 2009–10 Brazilian Superliga – "Best Server"
 2011 Pan-American Cup – "Most Valuable Player"
 2011 South American Championship – "Most Valuable Player"
 2012 Summer Olympics – "Best Server"
 2012 South American Club Championship – "Most Valuable Player"
 2012 FIVB Club World Championship – "Best Most Valuable Player"
 2012 FIVB Club World Championship – "Best Scorer"
 2013 South American Championship – "Best
Opposite Spiker"
 2014 FIVB World Grand Prix – "Best Opposite Spiker"
 2014 FIVB World Championship – "Best Opposite Spiker"
 2016 FIVB World Grand Prix – "Best Outside Spiker"
 ''2022 Athletes Unlimited "Best Opposite Hitter"

Clubs

 2001–02 Brazilian Superliga –  Champion, with Minas
 2007–08 Italian League –  Champion, with Scavolini Pesaro
 2010–11 Brazilian Superliga –  Champion, with Unilever Vôlei
 2014–15 Turkish League –  Runner-up, with Vakıfbank Istanbul
 2015–16 Turkish League –  Champion, with Vakıfbank Istanbul
 2012 South American Club Championship –  Champion, with Molico Osasco
 2014 South American Club Championship –  Runner-up, with Molico Osasco
 2020 South American Club Championship –  Champion, with Itambé/Minas
 2007–08 CEV Cup –  Champion, with Scavolini Pesaro
 2014–15 CEV Champions League –  Bronze medal, with Vakıfbank Istanbul
 2015–16 CEV Champions League –  Runner-up, with Vakıfbank Istanbul
 2012 FIVB Club World Championship -  Champion, with Sollys Nestlé Osasco
 2014 FIVB Club World Championship -  Runner-Up, with Molico Osasco

References

"Brazilian Women Win Gold in Style"

External links
FIVB profile
Personal website

1983 births
Living people
Brazilian women's volleyball players
Sportspeople from Belo Horizonte
Volleyball players at the 2008 Summer Olympics
Olympic volleyball players of Brazil
Olympic gold medalists for Brazil
Volleyball players at the 2007 Pan American Games
Volleyball players at the 2011 Pan American Games
Olympic medalists in volleyball
Volleyball players at the 2012 Summer Olympics
Volleyball players at the 2016 Summer Olympics
Medalists at the 2012 Summer Olympics
Medalists at the 2008 Summer Olympics
Pan American Games gold medalists for Brazil
Pan American Games silver medalists for Brazil
Pan American Games medalists in volleyball
Opposite hitters
Outside hitters
Brazilian expatriates in Italy
Brazilian expatriate sportspeople in Turkey
Expatriate volleyball players in Italy
Expatriate volleyball players in Turkey
Medalists at the 2011 Pan American Games